Warr Glacier is a broad glacier flowing north into the southwest arm of Murphy Inlet, Thurston Island. Named by Advisory Committee on Antarctic Names (US-ACAN) after William Warr, Aviation Machinist's Mate in the Eastern Group of U.S. Navy Operation Highjump, 1946–47. Warr and five others survived the December 30, 1946 crash of a PBM Mariner seaplane on adjacent Noville Peninsula.

See also
 List of glaciers in the Antarctic
 Glaciology

Maps
 Thurston Island – Jones Mountains. 1:500000 Antarctica Sketch Map. US Geological Survey, 1967.
 Antarctic Digital Database (ADD). Scale 1:250000 topographic map of Antarctica. Scientific Committee on Antarctic Research (SCAR). Since 1993, regularly upgraded and updated.

Glaciers of Thurston Island